The Australian Press Council (APC) was established in 1976 and is responsible for promoting high standards of media practice, community access to information of public interest, and freedom of expression through the media. The Council is also the principal body with responsibility for responding to complaints about Australian newspapers, magazines and digital outlets.

Regulation of broadcast media in Australia is conducted by the Australian Communications and Media Authority.

The APC was only established after the Federal Government began preparation of legislation to create a government authority to ensure accountability in 1975.

In accordance with its Constitution, the Council pursues its goals by:
 considering and dealing with complaints and concerns about material in newspapers, magazines and journals, published either in print or on the internet;
 encouraging and supporting initiatives to address the causes for reader's complaints and concerns;
 keeping under review, and where appropriate, challenging developments which may adversely affect the dissemination of information of public interest and may consequently threaten the public's right to know;
 making representations to governments, public inquiries and other forums as appropriate on matters concerning freedom of speech and access to information;
 undertaking research and consultation on developments in public policy affecting freedom of speech, and promoting;
 promoting an understanding of the roles and activities of the council through forums and consultations; and encouraging feedback for Council's consideration 
The Council is funded by its publisher members in the newspaper and magazine industries. It relies on publishers and editors to respect the Council's standards and decisions, to adhere voluntarily to standards of good practice and to publish adjudications that result from complaints made against them. It has no legal or legislative power to fine or penalise the press.

Functions
The Council's standards of good media practice are contained in its Statements of Principles, Specific Standards and Advisory Guidelines. The standards are applied by the Council when considering complaints and are used as the basis for statements by Council representatives about good media practice, whether addressing practitioners within the industry, journalism students or the broader community. The council also undertakes research and convenes conferences and seminars on aspects of media standards.

The Council's Statement of General Principles was substantially revised in 2014.

The Council's mandate to consider complaints extends to all print publications and related digital outlets, such as websites, of publishers which are "constituent bodies" of the council. These publications comprise about 90 percent of all print and online outlets in Australia representing some 850 mastheads.

The Council also issues statements on policy matters within its areas of interest, including through submissions to parliamentary committees, commissions and other public bodies. It also undertakes research and convenes or participates in conferences and seminars on policy issues.

Members
The Australian Press Council comprises:
 The Chair
 A Vice-Chair and other Public Members who have no affiliation with a media organisation
 Nominees of media organisations, including major publishers of newspapers and magazines; a nominee for small publishers, as well as a nominee for the principal union for employees in the media industry
 Independent Journalist Members who are not employed by a media organisation

The independent Chair is appointed by the Council. The Public Members and Independent Journalist Members are appointed by the Council on the nomination of the Chair. The nominees of publishers are chosen by the media organisations which have agreed to support the Council and be subject to its complaints system. It meets quarterly, and is headed on administrative and other matters by an Executive Director.

The current Chair of the Australian Press Council is Neville Stevens (effective 22 January 2018). The inaugural Chairman was Sir Frank Kitto. He was followed by Geoffrey Sawer, Hal Wootten, David Flint, Dennis Pearce, Ken McKinnon, Julian Disney and David Weisbrot.

In 1979, during the run-up to the South Australian state election, the News Limited owned The News campaigned against the Australian Labor Party in South Australia. A successful complaint was heard in relation to which the News Limited representatives alleged contained irregular procedures, leading the News to withdraw from the APC in 1980. News rejoined the Press Council in 1987, but, as the single most important source of funding, its relationship with the body has been fraught. [see Criticisms by News Corp, below]

The Media Entertainment and Arts Alliance (MEAA) withdrew from the Press Council for nineteen years between 1986 and 2005. The organisation rejoined but withdrew once again in 2021. However, it continues to have a representative on Council as, under the rules of the APC, four years notice to withdraw must be given. The MEAA will officially leave the APC in 2025.

In 2012, Seven West Media, publisher of The West Australian, withdrew from the APC and set up its own complaints body, the Independent Media Council, to handle complaints against its print and publications and websites. The company cited its unwillingness to fund a substantially strengthened Press Council.

The APC receives more than 700 complaints each year. About three-quarters of those which are fully pursued by the complainant result in a correction, apology or some other form of action being taken.

Where the complaint is resolved through a formal adjudication, the relevant publisher is required to publish the adjudication promptly and with due prominence.

Reform
The Council has in the past been criticised for being unable to censure its members in anything more than a minor manner when standards are breached and for being a "toothless tiger" as a result of being funded by the publishers whose work it is meant to evaluate.

The former Chairman of Australian Consolidated Press, Kerry Packer described the council as "window dressing" at a 1991 parliamentary inquiry into the print media. A former chair of the council, Professor Dennis Pearce, told the Finkelstein Media Inquiry that the authority was overly influenced by concerns of losing its sponsors and that the industry was reluctant to fund its own watchdog.

Another former Chairman, Ken McKinnon supported calls for the APC to have a stronger role and be better resourced, instead of statutory regulation. The Australian Greens Senator Bob Brown has described the APC as a "hollow vessel" and supports reform towards a statutory body with better funding.

In the wake of the Finkelstein Media Inquiry, publishers agreed on a major strengthening of the Press Council. Funding was raised from $0.8 million to $1.6 million in 2012-13 and $1.8 million in the following year.

News Corp Australia, Fairfax Media, the media union (MEAA) and the other publisher members of the council agreed to specific funding commitments for the three years, with subsequent commitments to be agreed at least two to three years in advance.

Under the new arrangements, publisher members are required to give four years’ notice of withdrawal from the council and will remain part of the council throughout that period. Their obligations to provide funding and comply with council processes became legally binding.

The then chair of the Press Council, Prof. Julian Disney, said at that time:

“The publishers’ commitments are very welcome and will greatly strengthen the Council’s resources and effectiveness. Now that continued membership and greatly-improved funding have been guaranteed for the next three years, the Council can implement a sustained program to fulfill its responsibilities across print and online media…. The package substantially addresses key concerns expressed by the Finkelstein Inquiry about the Council’s capacity to strengthen its independence and effectiveness."

Since 2010, the Council has undergone a major transformation; doubling its budget, increasing its membership and staff, and moving to new premises in Sydney. As well as boosting its work on standards of practice, it has strengthened its processes for handling complaints and for ensuring that adjudications are prominently published by member organisations.

A number of online-only publications have joined the Press Council, including Crikey, Mumbrella, and Ninemsn.

LGBTI Issues and the Chairmanship of Neville Stevens

On 2 May 2017, the Australian Press Council dismissed a complaint against a member publisher alleging unwarranted emphasis placed on the transgender status of an individual accused of a violent crime.[8] According to the complaint, the article contained 15x references to the transgender status of the accused in the body of the article, numerous references in the headline, and a further 6 references in the captions accompanying the photographs. The article contained no obvious public interest justification for the prominent emphasis given to the person's transgender status.

It has been a long standing principle of the APC that a publisher should not place unwarranted emphasis on a person's race or religion or sexual orientation and the APC has upheld numerous complaints about articles that place unwarranted emphasis on such characteristics. The APC has repeatedly declined to reach the same conclusion about gratuitous reporting on a person's transgender status.

The decision appeared to follow several previous decisions of the Council that may treat complaints about transgender people less favourably in the application of the General Principles. In September 2015, the Council dismissed a complaint that prominently referred to an accused person as "transgender and "pre-surgery" in the headlines. The article also contained four further references to the transgender status of the accused in the body of the article. Despite the absence of any public interest justification for the prominent and repeated references, the Council held that the article did not breach General Principle #6.[9] The APC also dismissed a complaint about an article in Bairnsdale Advertiser in 2013 which attempted to link transgender or gender non-conforming Australians with paedophilia and sexual abuse of children. The Council dismissed the complaint citing "freedom of expression".[10]

In 2018, the complainant submitted a complaint of discrimination against the APC to the Anti-Discrimination Board and the matter was referred to the NSW Civil and Administrative Tribunal for legal determination. [11]

Under the stewardship of Neville Stevens, the APC elected to defend its decision-making in Court rather than acknowledge the error, correct the adjudication's findings, and implement measures to eliminate conscious and unconscious bias in its decision-making. The solicitors for the APC filed several motions including an application for 'separate questions proceedings' to determine whether the APC provides a service when dealing with complaints. The APC's Executive Director, John Pender, provided extensive affidavit evidence in support of the APC's case. The Tribunal lost the 'separate questions' dispute in a Tribunal ruling of 8 July, 2020. The APC appealed the decision and lost again.[12]

The organisation's 2018-2019 annual report stated that "Council vigorously defended its processes." Neville Stephen's foreword in the report states that the Council elected to "divert significant resources in this period to defend legal proceedings about its processes and decisions." As at February 2021, resolution time for many complaints has ballooned out to more than a year.

In August 2011, the APC released new Specific Standards on Coverage of Suicide. The standards stress the importance of the discussion of suicide in helping to improve public understanding of the causes and warning signs of suicide and act as a deterrent. However they say that reporting of methods should not be published, care must be taken not to spark “copycat” suicides, and details of suicide hotlines and helplines should be included in the relevant news reports.

In July 2014, the APC released new Specific Standards on Contacting Patients.  The aim of these Standards is to facilitate media contact with people in hospitals and residential care facilities, while also ensuring respect for the health, dignity and privacy of those people and their families and for the general provision of care on the premises. In particular, the Standards aim to:
 prevent unreasonable exclusion of journalists from hospitals;
 promote a co-operative approach between journalists and hospitals;
 prevent inappropriate contact by journalists with a patient who is in a vulnerable position; and
 prevent undue intrusion by journalists on other patients and hospital staff.

In March 2016, the APC released a new Advisory Guideline on Family and Domestic Violence Reporting. The Advisory Guideline is not intended to constrain or discourage news coverage or forthright debate about family violence. However, editors and journalists routinely exercise judgment about which events to cover; what information to collect and from whom; what material to include and what may be excluded in the interests of space and concision; and how to frame the story. The purpose of the Advisory Guideline is to help guide those considerations and consider the issues of safety, responsibilities, cultural sensitivities, context and content, and sources of assistance.

Criticisms by News Corp in 2014
Beginning in August 2014, The Australian newspaper, owned by News Corp Australia, published a series of more than 20 articles and editorials highly critical of the Press Council’s activities and leadership. The newspaper accused the Council of overstepping its mandate and issuing questionable adjudications.

In an editorial published on 9 August 2014, the newspaper said it had “lost confidence in APC chairman Julian Disney and deplores the direction in which he has taken the council”.

The editorial continued:

“The APC has become erratic in its rulings, unmoored from its foundations, ponderous and serpentine in its procedures, side-tracked by its chairman’s peculiar tastes and political predilections and ineffective as a body that promotes good practice.”

In a subsequent article in Crikey on 11 August 2014, David Salter, the former Executive Producer of the ABC TV Program Media Watch, noted that “The Australian has turned its particular brand of venom on Julian Disney, chair of the Press Council”.

Salter wrote:

“Self-regulation, at least in the ethical fantasyland of News Corp, is only a worthwhile system of media accountability so long as it doesn’t inquire into the abuse of a newspaper’s power to pursue vendettas and parade its own paranoia…. More importantly, this whole unpleasant episode demonstrates the hypocrisies that underpin the media self-regulation construct in Australia. In response to the perceived threats of the Finkelstein Inquiry and the Convergence Review, newspaper proprietors rushed to ‘strengthen’ the Press Council's authority and increase its funding.

Now we have proof that this was all window dressing. If the APC's processes and findings don't suit a powerful member such as News Corp, it refuses to play by the rules and trashes the chair's reputation. Self-regulation is no regulation at all.”

In an interview on ABC Radio’s Media Report program, Julian Disney said: “There's always, over the years, been tensions way back to the start of the Council, not only with News Corp but with Fairfax from time to time.  News pulled out only four years into the life of the Council, when the Chair was a High Court judge.  So these tensions come and go, and I think they're felt more strongly in some parts of an organisation than others, and sometimes there are other pressures.”

The Press Council pointed out factual inaccuracies in The Australian's criticisms, and an alleged lack of balance and fairness in the series of attack articles. At a Council meeting on 28 August 2014, a resolution re-affirming support for Julian Disney was passed and made public. The resolution, passed by 19 votes to nil, with one abstention, read in part:

“The Press Council reaffirms its confidence in the Chair and rejects the recent misrepresentations made by The Australian about the Chair and the Council. It also deplores the breach by The Australian of obligations of confidentiality during the Council’s complaint processes. The Council will continue to work with News Corp to resolve any legitimate concerns.”

David Weisbrot's chairmanship 
After taking over as chair in March 2015, Professor David Weisbrot spent much of his time meeting with member publishers, editors, leading journalists, officials of the MEAA, media and communications academics, and members of the NGOs, peak associations, and community groups with which the council regularly interacts.

During his tenure as chair, the Press Council:
 organised an international conference on press freedom to help mark the council's 40'' anniversary;
 developed the council's first-ever strategic plan;
 developed the council's first-ever reconciliation action plan;
 reached out to the Indigenous press and the multicultural press, gaining membership from these communities for the first time;
 worked to increase the council's membership from among online-only publications, including a number of major international publishers;
 emphasised and energised the council's role as a strong public defender of free speech, press freedom and open and transparent government;
 revamped and refreshed the council's Press Freedom Medals awards, to make them more relevant to the industry and the society;
 introduced a customised Resolve IT system for handling, tracking and reporting on complaints;
 appointed two women as chairs of adjudication panels, and one of them as a Vice-Chair, to ensure greater diversity in the management of the council's affairs;
 reviewed and revised the council's many older advisory guidelines;
 developed a new Advisory Guideline on Reporting Family Violence;
 made significant progress on  the development of an Advisory Guideline on Reporting on Children;
 entered into a closer collaboration with Journalism Education and Research Association of Australia (JERAA)  to award annual prizes to journalism students;
 produced a set of teaching materials about media ethics that are now widely used in Australian journalism schools;
 developed closer ties to other press councils in the region, especially New Zealand, Indonesia, Papua New Guinea and Timor Leste; 
 developed closer ties to other press councils internationally, such as those in South Africa and Canada, as well as through the Alliance of Independent Press Councils of Europe (A1PCE); and
 developed a positive presence on social media, using it to promote the council's work, highlight adjudication decisions and provide notice of awards and scholarship programs.
In a major address to the Melbourne Press Club on 6 August 2015, Professor Weisbrot stated:

“Whatever benefits those procedural refinements may deliver, they are likely to pale in comparison with the benefits that will come from cultural change and a belief that the maintenance of high standards in the industry must be a shared enterprise.

As I mentioned at the outset, for most of its history the Press Council has been perceived as the ‘watchdog’ or the ‘cop on the beat’ - in other words, its presence might tend to discourage poor journalistic practice by putting the fear of God into publishers and practitioners, giving the public an opportunity to bring complaints, and then whacking those unfortunate few whose alleged transgressions happened to be complained about.

And publishers and journalists who pride themselves on their professionalism clearly do not relish the experience of having to publish a negative adjudication.

But focusing on a particular breach of the Council’s Standards in the past and then publicising it probably channels too much energy, attention and resources on the aberrant cases - the roughly 40 cases in any particular year that go all the way from initial receipt to final adjudication.

And since it’s such a relatively small number, most journalists, editors and publishers may feel that those aberrant cases have nothing to do with them.

What we need to do instead is to create a different culture: one that is collegial and intelligent, that continually learns from experience….

We urgently need to move away from the system of punishing individual transgressions in our industry and feeling that such action alone maintains high standards across the entire profession.  While the need to identify and sanction poor practice will remain, there are much better strategies for achieving industry-wide improvement, and reassuring the community that this is the case.”

Professor Weisbrot resigned as chair effective 18 July 2017. The council's two vice-chairs, the John Doyle and Julie Kinross, took over the position jointly while a replacement for Professor Weisbrot was being recruited.

The Australian Press Council appointed Neville Stevens as its new chair effective 22 January 2018. Stevens has wide experience chairing panels and reviews in the private and public sectors and is a distinguished former public servant who headed two major Australian government departments, one of them dealing with telecommunications, media and broadcasting.

See also

Media of Australia

References

External links

1976 establishments in Australia
Australian journalism organisations
Mass media complaints authorities
Organizations established in 1976
Consumer organisations in Australia
Regulation in Australia